A Flame to the Ground Beneath is the second and final studio album by the Swedish power metal band Lost Horizon, released in 2003.

In 2017, Loudwire ranked it as the 7th best power metal album of all time.

Track listing

Personnel
Transcendental Protagonist (Wojtek Lisicki) - guitars
Cosmic Antagonist (Martin Furängen) - bass
Preternatural Transmogrifyer (Christian Nyquist) - drums
Perspicacious Protector (Attila Publik) - keyboards
Ethereal Magnanimus (Daniel Heiman) - vocals
Equilibrian Epicurius (Fredrik Olsson) - guitars

References

2003 albums
Lost Horizon (band) albums